Fernando Gleber Matias da Silva, better known as Fernando Pilar, is a Brazilian footballer currently playing for Sociedade Esportiva River Plate. Fernando was born in Paraíba, Brazil on 2 February 1979. Fernando Pilar began his career with Brazilian team Vasco from 1998 to 2002 when he moved to lower division team Campinense for two years until 2004 when he was transferred from Campinense to Central, where he had three seasons with great performances and because of his performances he was bought by Portuguese team Paços de Ferreira.

References

External links
 CBF

Living people
1979 births
Brazilian footballers
Brazilian expatriate footballers
CR Vasco da Gama players
Campinense Clube players
Central Sport Club players
Sportspeople from Paraíba
Botafogo Futebol Clube (PB) players
F.C. Paços de Ferreira players
Association football midfielders